Kuruvannil Govindan Marar (17 September 1934 – 25 April 1995) was an Indian social worker, politician, former State president of the Bharatiya Janata Party (BJP) in Kerala, India. he is also known as mararji  He was the third son among four children of Narayana Marar and Nayan Marsyar. By occupation he was a teacher at Government School Parassinikadavu (The school near to the famous Parassinikadavu Muthappan Temple, Kannur District, Kerala) and left his profession to become a full-time social worker. Arrested during Indian Emergency of 25 June 1975 – 21 March 1977, he was imprisoned for 18 months. After getting released from the jail, Marar became the leader of Janata party and the District President of Kannur. In 1980 Marar became the State Secretary of BJP. He was very active in Kerala Political scenario and held various positions including State General Secretary and State President of BJP. He has actively represented BJP in various elections, the last one in 1991 where he got defeated by a margin of 1000 votes from Manjeshwar constituency. His body was cremated at Payyambalam beach, Kannur.

Kummanam Rajashekharan became the second full-time worker for the RSS after Marar to hold the party state president portfolio.
The state committee office of Kerala BJP is named after K G Marar as Mararji smruthi mandiram.

External links

1934 births
1995 deaths
Malayali politicians
Kerala politicians
Bharatiya Janata Party politicians from Kerala
Indians imprisoned during the Emergency (India)
People from Kannur district
Bharatiya Lok Dal politicians